Oystering machinery is machinery used for the farming or fishing of oysters. Various machines are used for the cultivation, harvesting, and transport of oysters.

What the machines do

Oyster hatcheries use a nursery tank system to keep oyster larvae alive. The nursery system was developed in Florida, and ensures the larvae have algae to eat. To ensure the hatchery water is clean, filters are used. Filters have different jobs, including making sure there is algae to feed the oyster larvae and cleaning the water to maintain a suitable environment for their growth.

In addition to the nursery tank system, small boats and rafts made in Italy are used to gather oysters that cannot be reached by bare foot. During the collection process. During the collection process, small knives are used to separate the oysters from the rocks.

The hatchery
Nowadays hatcheries have expanded with more machines than before. The hatchery is not a factory, it is a place for oysters to grow and be harvested and then transported. The oyster larva has a soft body. It begins to grow an outer skin and finds an solid mass to settle on.

See also
Oyster farming

Aquaculture
Oysters